Madacy Lifestyle Marketing (formerly Madacy Entertainment) was a company based in Mount Royal, Quebec, that published DVDs, CDs and VHS tapes. Most of the products were frequently seen in many discount stores in the United States and Canada, often at low retail prices, as compared to releases by major labels. It was owned by the Canadian investment company Clarke, who bought the company in 2008.

Many of their releases are taken from public domain sources. Some of the songs on their albums are cover versions, either recorded by the original singers themselves, The Wonder Kids Choir, or by Madacy's in-house performers, the Countdown Singers.

References

External links
Official website archived at the Wayback Machine

Companies based in Montreal
Mount Royal, Quebec
Quebec record labels
Record labels established in 1980